The 1923–24 Huddersfield Town season saw Town become the champions of English football for the first time. They beat Welsh side Cardiff City to the title by goal average.

Squad at the start of the season

Review
After finishing 3rd the previous season and winning the FA Cup the season before, some thought that a championship under Herbert Chapman wasn't impossible. The season would see Town reach the pinnacle of football excellence and win the 1st Division.

This was done with Town only having 5 different scorers all season; George Brown with 8, George Cook with 9, Clem Stephenson with 11, Billy Smith with 13 and Charlie Wilson top-scoring with 18 league goals. (Billy Johnston did score an FA Cup goal). The title went down to the last match and Town's 3-0 win over Nottingham Forest giving Town their title by goal average.

Squad at the end of the season

Results

Division One

FA Cup

Appearances and goals

Huddersfield Town A.F.C. seasons
Huddersfield Town F.C.
1924